The Latécoère 631 was a civil transatlantic flying boat built by Latécoère, the largest ever built up to its time. The type was not a success, being unreliable and uneconomic to operate. Five of the eleven aircraft built were written off in accidents and one was lost during World War II.

Design and development
The aircraft was ordered in 1938. It was intended that it would be powered by six Gnome et Rhône P.18 engines of  each. A competitor for this specification was the SNCASE SE.200 Amphitrite.

Construction of the aircraft was stopped due to the outbreak of World War II and was not resumed until after the signing of the Franco-German Armistice. The prototype, registered F-BAHG, first flew on 4  November 1942. It was subsequently confiscated by the Germans, and passed to the Luftwaffe, who allocated the codes 61+11. The aircraft was flown to Lake Constance, where it was destroyed in an attack by two Royal Air Force de Havilland Mosquito aircraft on 17 April 1944. SNCASE SE.200 Amphitrite 20+01 was destroyed in the same attack.

History

The second aircraft, F-BANT, first flew on 7 March 1945. It was powered by six Wright Cyclone engines of  each. Four aircraft were purchased by Air France, and entered service on the Biscarrosse-Port-Étienne-Fort de France route in July 1947. The aircraft were withdrawn from service in August 1948 following the loss of F-BDRC. SEMAF operated two aircraft until 1950, when the survivor was withdrawn following the loss of F-BANU. The Société France Hydro operated one aircraft until it was lost on 10 September 1955. This was the last flying aircraft, with the remaining four survivors being scrapped. The Latécoère 631 was not a success due to it being unreliable and uneconomic to operate.

Accidents and incidents
31 October 1945 An Air France Latécoère 631 (F-BANT) was operating a flight from Rio de Janeiro, Brazil, to Montevideo, Uruguay, and Buenos Aires, Argentina, when the propeller of No. 3 engine separated in flight and debris struck the No. 2 engine. A propeller blade sliced a  hole in the cabin, killing two passengers. A small fire started and an emergency landing was made in the Laguna de Rocha, Uruguay. The aircraft was subsequently repaired and returned to service. The celebrated poet, diplomat and composer Vinicius de Moraes and writer Rubem Braga, both Brazilians, were on board.
21 February 1948 A Latécoère 631 (F-BDRD) was on a delivery flight from Le Havre, Seine-Maritime, to Biscarrosse, Landes when it crashed into the English Channel off Saint-Marcouf, Manche, in a snowstorm with the loss of all nineteen people on board. The aircraft lacked any Ice protection system.
1 August 1948 Air France Flight 072 (F-BDRC) ditched in the Atlantic Ocean for reasons unknown with the loss of all 52 people on board. The aircraft was operating a flight from Fort-de-France, Martinique, to Port-Étienne (now Nouadhibou), Mauritania. Following this loss, the Latécoère 631 was withdrawn from service by Air France. The United States Coast Guard ship  reported finding debris on August 4 but no sign of survivors.
28 March 1950 A SEMAF Latécoère 631 (F-WANU) crashed into the Atlantic Ocean off Cap Ferret, Gironde, after the aileron control couplings failed due to severe vibration in one of the engines gearboxes with the loss of all twelve people on board. The aircraft was on a test flight from Biscarrosse to determine the cause of the crash of Air France Flight 072.
10 September 1955 A France-Hydro Latécoère 631 (F-BDRE) suffered wing separation (probably due to windshear) after flying into a tropical storm and crashed 38 mi north of Banyo, French Cameroon, killing all 16 on board. The aircraft was on a flight from Lac Lérè, Chad, to Douala, French Cameroon (now Cameroon), en route to Biscarrosse for maintenance.

Specifications (Latécoère 631)

Operators
  Air France.
  Latécoère.
  SEMAF.
  Société France-Hydro.
  Luftwaffe.

See also

Blohm & Voss BV222
Saunders Roe Princess
SNCASE SE.200

References

Bibliography

External links

 Laté-631 on Geneva lake (1948)
 Newsreel footage of the second aircraft
 Aviafrance

6
1940s French airliners
Flying boats
Six-engined tractor aircraft
High-wing aircraft
Aircraft first flown in 1942